Something Different is an album led by saxophonist Dexter Gordon recorded in 1975 and released on the Danish SteepleChase label in 1980.

Reception

In his review for AllMusic, Scott Yanow said "the music is at the same high quality level and in the same modern bop genre as one would expect".

Track listing
 "Freddie Freeloader" (Miles Davis) - 8:33
 "When Sunny Gets Blue" (Jack Segal, Marvin Fisher) - 6:08
 "Invitation" (Bronisław Kaper) - 9:13 		
 "Freddie Freeloader" [Take 3] (Davis) - 7:48 Bonus track on CD reissue 
 "Yesterday's Mood" [Take 4] (Slide Hampton) - 8:03 Bonus track on CD reissue 
 "Winther's Calling" (Dexter Gordon) - 9:55
 "Polkadots and Moonbeams" - (Jimmy Van Heusen, Johnny Burke) - 9:03
 "Yesterday's Mood" (Hampton) - 8:08

Personnel
Dexter Gordon - tenor saxophone
Philip Catherine - guitar
Niels-Henning Ørsted Pedersen - bass 
Billy Higgins - drums

References

1980 albums
Dexter Gordon albums
SteepleChase Records albums